Raycom Media, Inc. was an American television broadcasting company based in Montgomery, Alabama. Raycom owned and/or provided services for 65 television stations and two radio stations across 44 markets in 20 states. Raycom, through its Community Newspaper Holdings subsidiary, also owned multiple newspapers in small and medium-sized markets throughout the United States.

History

Raycom's three founding owners were Stephen Burr (a Boston lawyer), Ken Hawkins (general manager) and William Zortman (news director) with funding from Retirement Systems of Alabama. In 1996, Raycom purchased 15 television and two radio stations and Bert Ellis's Raycom Sports from Ellis Communications for over $700 million. In mid-1996, the company agreed to purchase eight stations from Federal Enterprises Inc. of suburban Detroit for $160 million. Raycom bought Aflac's broadcast division of five TV stations in August 1996, using, in part, a loan from the RSA. The three groups merged to form Raycom Media. John Hayes initially headed up the company until 2001.:2

In 1998, Raycom took a 35% stake in Worldnow, an internet publishing provider for broadcast media.:2 That same year, Raycom purchased Malrite Communications, owner of five stations: two Puerto Rico stations, three Ohio stations, and one Florida station.

In 2001, Paul McTear took over as Raycom's president and CEO from Hayes.:2 In 2003, Raycom Media bought out all of the Fox-affiliated television stations from Waitt Broadcasting. 
 
In April 2005, Raycom tested The Tube Music Network on station WFLX, a Fox affiliate, for three weeks. Raycom announced on April 25, 2005, it was the launch station group for The Tube affiliating 29 stations. Raycom launched the network in June 2005 on 30 stations. Raycom Media was an initial round investor in The Tube Music Network.

On January 31, 2006, the company acquired the Liberty Corporation. Raycom agreed to affiliate its NBC stations' subchannels with NBC Weather Plus, a joint venture between the affiliates and the NBC station group. In August, Raycom sold a dozen of its stations to Barrington Broadcasting.

On November 12, 2007, Raycom announced its intention to acquire some of the television broadcasting properties of Lincoln National Corporation's Lincoln Financial Media for $583 million. Lincoln Financial Sports was merged into Raycom Sports later that year. The purchase of the stations were completed on April 2, 2008.

Around 2010, Raycom moved into producing its own programming. In September 2011, Raycom partnered with E.W. Scripps and Cox Media to produce Right This Minute. Also in 2011, the company partnered with ITV Studios America and launched America Now, a lifestyle-oriented news magazine. The magazine lasted until September 2014. In partnership with Bellum Entertainment Group in 2014, Flip My Food and Fix It and Finish It were launched as lead in strips to Raycom early newscasts. In the third quarter of 2014, Raycom purchased RTM Productions, based in Nashville and produces PowerNation branded auto-oriented shows for the Paramount Network, NBCSN, and CBS Sports Network.:2 Raycom acquired the assets of live and studio sports programming production company Tupelo-Honey Productions in January 2012.

In 2011, Raycom was an initial investor in Bounce TV, a broadcast subchannel network.1 Raycom News Network Digital Hub, an online news aggregator and exchange, was started in 2011 at the company's main office in Montgomery, Alabama.:2 Raycom Media was an initial investor in Katz Broadcasting, launched in 2014 and a Bounce affiliated subchannel network group.

On November 20, 2013, Raycom entered into a shared services agreement to operate Louisiana Media Company's WVUE-TV in New Orleans.

On August 10, 2015, Raycom announced that it would purchase stations owned by Drewry Communications for $160 million. The sale was completed on December 1, 2015.

Raycom acquired Indianapolis-based sports production company WebStream Sports on September 14, 2015. WebStream was subsequently merged with existing Raycom entity Tupelo Honey to form Tupelo Raycom.

In October 2015, Raycom acquired Fox affiliate KNIN-TV for $14.5 million from E. W. Scripps Company; the FCC required that the station be divested during Scripps' acquisition of Journal Communications, but Scripps entered into shared services agreements with Raycom to continue operating KNIN.

Raycom purchased PureCars, a digital ad platform focused on automotive sales, for $125 million in November 2015.

On April 4, 2017, Raycom reached an agreement to acquire WVUE outright.

In May 2017, Raycom purchased Calkins Media's WWSB and WTXL-TV. A sale of Calkins' WAAY-TV to Raycom affiliate American Spirit Media was blocked by the Department of Justice due to Raycom's ownership of WAFF-TV, and was instead sold to Heartland Media. The deal increased Raycom's reach to 16% of U.S. television households.

On September 25, 2017, Raycom announced that it would merge with Community Newspaper Holdings (CNHI), which was principally owned by Retirement Systems of Alabama. CNHI would continue to operate as a subsidiary of Raycom. To comply with FCC newspaper cross-ownership restrictions, Raycom divested newspapers in the seven markets where CNHI and Raycom both owned properties.

On June 14, 2018, Raycom announced the launch of InvestigateTV, an OTT app that showcased longer-form content from Raycom as well as content from ProPublica, News21 at Arizona State University’s Cronkite School of Journalism, and NerdWallet.

On June 25, 2018, Gray Television announced its intent to acquire Raycom for $3.65 billion, pending regulatory approval. The combined company would be led by Raycom's current president and CEO Pat LaPlatney, with current Gray CEO Hilton Howell acting as executive chairman and co-CEO. The acquisition, which Gray expected to close in late 2018, would give Gray 142 stations in 92 markets, making Gray the third-largest owner of television stations in the United States, with a total market share of 24%. CNHI, which was sold separately, was not included in the sale to Gray. The sale was approved by the FCC on December 20. The deal was completed on January 2, 2019.

Operations 
Prior to its merger with Gray, Raycom owned and/or operated 65 television stations and two radio stations in 44 markets located in 20 states, covering over 16% of U.S. television households. Raycom also employed more than 4,800 individuals in full- and part-time positions.

Television 
Stations are arranged alphabetically by state and by city of license.
 (**) indicates a station that was built and signed-on by Raycom Media.

Radio

Other assets
In addition to television stations, Raycom also owned:
Bounce TV (investment)
Broadview Media
Community Newspaper Holdings, Inc.
Frankly (20%)
WorldNow
Katz Broadcasting (investment)
Pure Cars
Raycom Sports
RTM Productions
PowerNation (automotive hobby programming for the Paramount Network, CBS Sports Network and NBCSN)

Tupelo Raycom 
Tupelo Raycom is Raycom Media's production company formed from the merger of Tupelo Honey Productions and WebStream Sports. Clients of the company include NBC, CBS, ESPN, Turner Sports, Fox, Travel Channel, Bounce TV and Live Nation.

Raycom acquired the assets of live and studio sports programming production company Tupelo-Honey Productions in January 2012. Tupelo Honey assets included a 50% share of MY Tupelo Entertainment, a joint venture form in 2009 as partnership between Cary Glotzer's Tupelo-Honey and Michael Yudin's MY-Entertainment Company. Yudin bought back Raycom's half of My Tupelo in March 2014.

Raycom acquired Indianapolis, Indiana-based sports production company WebStream Sports on September 14, 2015. WebStream was subsequently merged with existing Raycom entity Tupelo Honey to form Tupelo Raycom in January 2016.

Notes

License ownership/operational agreements

Satellites and semi-satellites

Mergers and acquisitions

References

External links 
InvestigateTV

American companies established in 1996
American companies disestablished in 2019
Defunct broadcasting companies of the United States
Defunct companies based in Alabama
Mass media companies established in 1996
Mass media companies disestablished in 2019
College sports television syndicators
Companies based in Montgomery, Alabama
Employee-owned companies of the United States
1996 establishments in Alabama
2019 disestablishments in Alabama
2019 mergers and acquisitions
Gray Television